Marquardt, a family-run company founded in 1925 and based in Rietheim-Weilheim, Germany, is a manufacturer of electromechanical and electronic switches and switching systems. The products of the company are used by customers in the automotive industry and include operating components, vehicle access, driver authorization systems and battery management systems. Additionally, the company's products are used in household appliances, industrial applications, as well as power tools. In total, the Marquardt Group employs approximately 10,600 people in 20 locations across four continents. There was a sales revenue of 1.2 billion euros generated by the company in fiscal year 2020, according to company reports. In terms of research and development, Marquardt invests approximately ten percent of its revenues each year into it.

Products 
The business unit “Automotive” develops and implements, among other things, drive authorization systems (such as drive authorization via smartphone, electronic keys and electronic ignition start switches, electronic steering locks, start-stop systems), operating components (such as seat adjustment switches, rotary light switches, door and convertible top control panels), ultra-wideband communication (UWB), and dynamic lighting systems. The "Mechatronic Devices" business unit develops, manufactures and sells, among other things, switching systems for power tools, sensors, systems and switches for the home and for industrial and electrical applications. The "Power and Energy Solutions" business unit has bundled the Marquardt competencies in the field of e-mobility since the beginning of 2021 and develops, produces and sells battery management systems from twelve to 800 volts, charging and converter systems for battery electric vehicles, as well as control units, sensors and electromechanical components for fuel cell vehicles.

Locations 
The Marquardt Group operates at a total of 20 locations in 14 countries on four continents.

Europe 
 Rietheim-Weilheim, Germany,  Headquarters (location for  production, sales and development)
 
 Böttingen, Germany (location for production) 
 Ichtershausen, Germany (location for production) 
 Trossingen, Germany (Independent lab for measurements of electromagnetic compatibility)
 Harrislee, Germany (location for production and sales) 
 Sibiu, Romania (location for production and development) 
 Lieusaint, France (location for sales and development) 
 Veles, North Macedonia (location for production) 
 Torino, Italy (location for sales) 
 Warwick, Great Britain (location for sales)

America 
 Cazenovia, USA (location for production, sales and development) 
 Rochester Hills, USA (location for sales and development) 
 Irapuato, Mexico (location for production)

Africa 
 Tunis, Tunisia (location for production)

Asia 
 Shanghai, China (location for production, sales and development) 
 Weihai, China (location for production)
 Mumbai, India (location for production, sales and development) 
 Pune, India (location for production, sales and development) 
 Seoul, South Korea (location for sales)
 Tokio, Japan (location for sales)

References

External links 

 Website Marquardt - Germany
 Marquardt product catalogue

Manufacturing companies of Germany